The Frustrated Contracts Act was an Act of Parliament passed in New Zealand in 1944. The Act codified into law the treatment of frustrated contracts, and replaced the previous common law remedies for frustration.

It was repealed by the Contract and Commercial Law Act 2017.

References

External links
Text of the Act

Statutes of New Zealand